Right to Remain Violent is an EP by Murderdolls, released in 2002 on Roadrunner Records. It was released to promote their forthcoming album at the time, Beyond the Valley of the Murderdolls. The three tracks featured are the same as the versions on the full-length album.

Track listing
"Dead in Hollywood" –  2:30
"Twist My Sister" –  2:06
"Let's Go to War" –  3:23

Credits
Wednesday 13 - vocals, bass
Joey Jordison - guitar, bass, drums
Tripp Eisen - lead guitar

External links

2002 EPs
Murderdolls albums
Roadrunner Records EPs
Horror punk EPs